Saint-Aignan-sur-Ry is a commune in the Seine-Maritime department in the Normandy region in northern France.

Geography
A small village northeast of Rouen on the D93 road, and borders on the southwest the bank of the river Crevon .

Heraldry

Population

Places of interest
 The church of St. Aignan, dating from the twelfth century.

See also
Communes of the Seine-Maritime department

References

Communes of Seine-Maritime